Vincent Michael Irizarry (born November 12, 1959) is an American actor. He was nominated for a Daytime Emmy Award in 1985 and 2002, and won in 2009.

Early life and education
Irizarry grew up on Long Island, NY and is one of six children. He moved to Lake Grove, early on.  At the age of 11, Irizarry began to study piano, becoming classically trained, then continued his studies at Berklee College of Music in Boston. There he fell in love with acting while performing in numerous productions with a regional theater company. He decided to move back to New York to sow the seeds for a career as a professional actor, soon winning a full-time scholarship with Lee Strasberg at his Theater Institute.

Career
Irizarry got his start in daytime television in 1983 as Brandon/Lujack Luvonaczek Spaulding on Guiding Light. His  character was paired up with Beth Raines (then Judi Evans Luciano) and they were considered a  "supercouple." He was nominated for a Daytime Emmy Award in 1985, but lost to future All My Children co-star Michael E. Knight. He then moved on to play Dr. Scott Clark from 1987 to 1989 on Santa Barbara. He also portrayed the role of Lujack Spaulding's twin brother, Nick McHenry Spaulding on Guiding Light from July 1991 to February 26, 1996. Irizarry returned for a cameo guest appearance in late-December 1996.

Later, Irizarry was cast in the role of Dr. David Hayward on the soap opera All My Children, a role he originated in 1997. Irizarry also crossed over to One Life to Live, during the infamous baby-swap storyline in 2005. In September 2006, after almost ten years as David, Irizarry was fired from AMC due to a lack of storyline. He portrayed David until November 28, 2006.

However, in November 2006, Irizarry joined the cast of The Young and the Restless as the character David Chow, first appearing on January 9, 2007. David Chow was romantically involved with Carmen Mesta, played by Marisa Ramirez, who was murdered soon afterward. Originally contracted for thirteen weeks, Irizarry's character proved popular and his stay on the soap was eventually extended.  He went on later to a romantic relationship with Nikki Newman while she was separated from husband Victor, but eventually decided to break up his relationship with Nikki. due to his difficulties with gambling. Chow was then killed in a car accident on August 1, 2008.

On August 17, 2008, a spokesperson for All My Children confirmed that Irizarry would reprise the role of David Hayward. Irizarry returned to the studio in September and began making regular appearances in October until it aired its final episode on September 23, 2011.

In December 2012, Irizarry announced on his Facebook page that he would be joining Prospect Park's online reboot of "All My Children" scheduled for spring of 2013. He reprised his Emmy award-winning role of "Dr. David Hayward" that he originated in 1997. It ran from April to September 2013.

In 2013, Irizarry appeared in an episode of Homeland, "Gerontion", where he plays a Montgomery County Police Department officer.

In August 2015, news broke that Irizarry joined the cast of NBC's Days of Our Lives, portraying the role of Deimos Kiriakis, the bitter and vindictive younger half-brother of Victor Kiriakis. Irizarry made his first appearance in early January 2016, due to the soap's advanced taping schedule. The actor was let go from the serial in February 2017, not long before he would receive a Daytime Emmy nomination.

Personal life
Irizarry's oldest child, Ash Harris, was born in May 1989.

He married actress Signy Coleman in July 1989 but they would divorce in 1992. Their daughter, Siena Sophia, was born in 1990. He married Avalon House in 1997 and they have two children, Aria (born August 1997) and Elias (born November 2001). Irizarry would confirm that he and House had separated and were in the process of getting a divorce in 2010.

He was in a relationship with clothing designer Donna Petracca.

On March 16, 2023, his son Elias, who had been a cadet at The Citadel, was convicted for his involvement in the January 6 United States Capitol Attack and sentenced to 14 days in prison.

Filmography

Awards
Daytime Emmy Nomination, Outstanding Younger Man- GL (1986)
Daytime Emmy Nomination, Outstanding Lead Actor- AMC (2002)
Daytime Emmy Pre-Nomination, Outstanding Lead Actor- AMC (2003, 2004)
Soap Opera Digest Outstanding Villain- AMC (1999)
Winner- Best Supporting Actor (tied with Jeff Branson)-AMC (2009)
Daytime Emmy Nomination, Outstanding Lead Actor- DOOL (2017)

References

External links
 
 Official Fall In Love Again Cabaret Show website
 Official Vincent Irizarry Photography website
 

1959 births
20th-century American male actors
21st-century American male actors
American male film actors
American male soap opera actors
American male television actors
Daytime Emmy Award winners
Daytime Emmy Award for Outstanding Supporting Actor in a Drama Series winners
Living people
Male actors from New York (state)
People from Queens, New York